Far Shariat (born April 6, 1976) is a film and television producer. He was a producer on the film Confessions of a Dangerous Mind. Shariat was an executive producer for NBC television drama series Life. Shariat has worked with Life creator Rand Ravich on films such as Confessions of a Dangerous Mind,  The Astronaut's Wife, The Maker and Crisis.

References

External links
 

1958 births
American television producers
Living people